Bernardino Visconti or Bernardino Conti (died 1540) was a Roman Catholic prelate who served as Bishop of Alatri (1537–1540).

On 29 October 1537, Bernardino Visconti was appointed during the papacy of Pope Paul III as Bishop of Alatri.
On 30 December 1537, he was consecrated bishop by Alfonso Oliva, Bishop of Bovino. 
He served as Bishop of Alatri until his death in 1540 in Rome, Italy.

References

External links and additional sources
 (for Chronology of Bishops) 
 (for Chronology of Bishops)  

16th-century Italian Roman Catholic bishops
Bishops appointed by Pope Paul III
1540 deaths